The slimtail skate (Bathyraja longicauda) is a species of fish in the family Arhynchobatidae. It is found in Chile and Peru in its natural habitat of open seas.

Sources

Bathyraja
Fish described in 1959
Taxa named by Fernando de Buen y Lozano
Taxonomy articles created by Polbot